"Tempted" is a song by Canadian rapper Jazz Cartier. It was released on January 6, 2017, as the lead single from his debut studio album, Fleurever. The song was produced by T-Minus and Lantz, with additional production by Sean Fischer.

Background and release
The song premiered on Zane Lowe’s Beats 1 Radio on January 3, 2017 on Apple Music, but was released for digital download as a single on iTunes on January 6, 2017. "Tempted" is the lead single from his debut album, Fleurever.

Music video
The music video was released on May 5, 2017 on Jazz Cartier's Vevo account on YouTube.

Commercial performance
"Tempted" debuted at number 91 on Canadian Hot 100 for the chart dated February 4, 2017. The song became his first chart entry on the chart and his most successful one to date.

Cultural crossover
A brief clip from the "Tempted" video was used in the TV version of The Cuckoo's Calling to represent the work of character Deeby Macc, who otherwise doesn't appear on screen.

Charts

Release history

References

External links

2017 singles
2017 songs
American hip hop songs
Songs written by T-Minus (record producer)
Song recordings produced by T-Minus (record producer)